The 2023 AFC U-20 Asian Cup qualification was an international men's under-20 football competition which was held to decide the participating teams of the 2023 AFC U-20 Asian Cup. It was held as under-20 tournament for the first time after rebranding by AFC.

Format changes 
The AFC Executive Committee had approved several strategic recommendations put forward by the AFC Competitions Committee. One of which was the removal of zoning principles in the AFC's youth competitions.

Draw 
Of the 47 AFC member associations, a total of 44 teams entered the competition. The final tournament hosts Uzbekistan decided to participate in qualification despite having automatically qualified for the final tournament. However. their matches will not be taken into account when calculating the group ranking and best second-placed teams among the groups. The draw was held on 24 May 2022.

The 44 teams were allocated to 4 groups of five teams and 6 groups of four teams, with teams seeded according to their performance in the 2018 AFC U-19 Championship final tournament and qualification (overall ranking shown in parentheses; NR stands for non-ranked teams). A further restriction was also applied, with the ten teams serving as qualification group hosts drawn into separate groups.

On 16 August, FIFA Council unanimously decided to suspend India with immediate effect due to undue influence from third parties, which constitutes a serious violation of the FIFA Statutes. On 27 August, FIFA lifted the suspension, allowing India to compete.

On 26 August, Australia withdrew from the tournament citing safety concerns due to the 2021–2022 Iraqi political crisis, leaving Group H with only three teams. Iraq were later removed as the hosts of the group due to the same reason, with the AFC deciding to move the fixtures to Kuwait and to be played from 14 to 18 October. Australia were reinstated into the group by the AFC on 14 September 2022.

Notes
Teams in bold qualified for the final tournament.
(H): Qualification group hosts (* Kuwait replaced Iraq as group hosts after the draw)
(Q): Final tournament hosts, automatically qualified regardless of qualification results

Player eligibility 
Players born on or after 1 January 2003 are eligible to compete in the tournament.

Format 
In each group, teams played each other once at a centralised venue. The ten group winners and the five best runners-up qualified for the final tournament.

Tiebreakers 
Teams were ranked according to points (3 points for a win, 1 point for a draw, 0 points for a loss), and if tied on points, the following tiebreaking criteria are applied, in the order given, to determine the rankings (Regulations Article 7.3):
Points in head-to-head matches among tied teams;
Goal difference in head-to-head matches among tied teams;
Goals scored in head-to-head matches among tied teams;
If more than two teams are tied, and after applying all head-to-head criteria above, a subset of teams are still tied, all head-to-head criteria above are reapplied exclusively to this subset of teams;
Goal difference in all group matches;
Goals scored in all group matches;
Penalty shoot-out if only two teams are tied and they met in the last round of the group;
Disciplinary points (yellow card = 1 point, red card as a result of two yellow cards = 3 points, direct red card = 3 points, yellow card followed by direct red card = 4 points);
Drawing of lots.

Groups 
The matches were played between 10 and 18 September 2022, with the exception of Group H which were played from 14 to 18 October.

Group A 
All matches were held in Saudi Arabia.
Uzbekistan competed in the qualifiers, but their matches were not taken into account when calculating the group ranking.
Times listed are UTC+3.

Group B 
All matches were held in Bahrain.
Times listed are UTC+3.

Group C 
All matches were held in Laos.
Times listed are UTC+7.

Group D 
All matches were held in Jordan.
Times listed are UTC+3.

Group E 
All matches were held in Mongolia.
Times listed are UTC+8.

Group F 
All matches were held in Indonesia.
Times listed are UTC+7.

Group G 
All matches were held in Oman.
Times listed are UTC+4.

Group H 
All matches were originally scheduled to be held in Iraq, but were later moved to Kuwait due to the 2021–2022 Iraqi political crisis.
Australia initially withdrew from the tournament citing safety reasons, but were reinstated when Iraq lost hosting rights.
Times listed are UTC+3.

Group I 
All matches were held in Tajikistan.
Times listed are UTC+5.

Group J 
All matches were held in Kyrgyzstan.
Times listed are UTC+6.

Ranking of second-placed teams 
Due to groups having a different number of teams, the results against the fifth-placed teams in five-team groups will not be considered for this ranking.

Qualified teams 
A total of 16 teams including hosts Uzbekistan qualified for the final tournament.

1 Bold indicates champions for that year. Italic indicates hosts for that year.
2 As South Vietnam

Goalscorers

Notes

See also 
2023 AFC U-20 Asian Cup
2023 AFC U-17 Asian Cup
2023 AFC U-17 Asian Cup qualification

References

External links 
 Official page

qual
AFC U-19 Championship qualification
2022 in Asian football
2022 in youth association football